Arbri Beqaj (born 29 September 1998) is an Albanian professional footballer who plays as a right back for KF Oriku.

Club career

Flamurtari Vlorë
A graduate of the Flamurtari youth academy, Beqaj made his league debut for the club on 22 December 2013 in a 1-0 away victory over Partizani Tirana. He was subbed on for Hair Zeqiri in the 87th minute.

Teuta Durrës
In July 2017, Beqaj moved to Albanian Superliga club KF Teuta Durrës on a free transfer. He made his league debut for the club on 12 October 2017 in a 2-1 home loss against Partizani Tirana. He was subbed on for Esin Hakaj in the 85th minute.

Laçi
In January 2018, Beqaj moved again, this time to Laçi in the Albanian Superliga. He made his league debut for the club on 26 January 2018 in a 3-1 away loss against Kamza. He was subbed on for Ndriçim Shtubina in the 61st minute.

International career

Albania U19 
Beqaj was called up at Albania national under-19 football team by coach Arjan Bellaj in the pre-eleminary squad for the 2017 UEFA European Under-19 Championship qualification from 6–11 October 2016. He then received a call up to the Albania under-19 by same coach Arjan Bellaj for the friendly tournament Roma Caput Mundi from 29 February–4 March 2016.

Career statistics

Club

References

1998 births
Living people
People from Selenicë
Footballers from Vlorë
Albanian footballers
Albania youth international footballers
Association football midfielders
KF Vlora players
Flamurtari Vlorë players
KF Teuta Durrës players
KF Laçi players
KF Oriku players
Kategoria Superiore players